The Hero Xtreme is a 150 cc motorcycle from Hero MotorCorp. It was Hero's 150 cc contender in place of Hero Honda CBZ Xtreme launched after moving out of the Hero Honda JV.  In June 2019, Hero MotoCorp launched a sportier version of its popular 150cc motorcycle in the form of the Xtreme Sports. Although the engine of Xtreme Sports was alike the traditional Hero Xtreme, the former had more power than the standard version.
But in 2020 hero launched 160 CV hero extreme bike.

References

External links
Hero Xtreme Sports

Xtreme